A total of 47 players represented New South Wales in Twenty20 cricket matches between the team's first and final matches, in January 2006 and October 2011. Following the introduction of the Big Bash League, New South Wales is effectively defunct in Twenty20 competitions, instead being replaced by two franchises—the Sydney Sixers and the Sydney Thunder.

List of players

List of captains

References

New South Wales
New South Wales, Twenty20
Cricket
Twenty20 cricketers